Persatuan Sepakbola Indonesia Jepara, also known as Persijap is an Indonesian football club based in Jepara, Central Java. After winning 2019 Liga 3, they compete in the Liga 2. Their nickname is Laskar Kalinyamat (Kalinyamat Warriors) and Elang Laut Jawa (Java Sea Eagles).

History

Foundation and early years (1954–1994) 
Persijap was founded on 11 April 1954. Syahlan Ridwan, Jepara's Regent founded the club. They have contributed players to the Indonesia national football team since 1979 when Haryanto was the first choice goalkeeper of the national team. Other national team players such as Siswandi Gancis, Solekan and Warsidi was from Persijap. They managed to win the Soeratin Cup in 1982.

Modern era and recent history (1994–present) 
Their recent achievements in Indonesian football was only their promotion to the Liga Indonesia Premier Division in 2000 and 2004 with coach Rudi William Keltjes. In the youth teams, they managed to add Soeratin Cup titles in 1998 and 2002. In 2007 they were also promoted to the newly formed Indonesia Super League. They were included in the Indonesia Premier League, before returning to the Indonesia Super League in September 2012.

In August 2014, they were relegated in the Liga Indonesia Premier Division.

Crest

Kit suppliers 

  Villour (2006–2009)
  Diadora (2009–2010)
  Lotto (2010–2011)
  Mitre (2011–2012)
  Red Warriors (2013)
  Eureka (2014)
  Kool (2015)
  Calsei (2016)
  MBB (2017)
  Al-Ikhsan (2018)
  Kaki Jersi (2019)
  Trops (2020)
  Degree (2021–)

Sponsorship
 2008-2015 = Bank Jateng
 2016 = Inservica System
 2017 = Inservica System & GO-JEK
 2018 = Inservica System & BPR BKK Jepara
 2019- = Oasis Mineral Waters

Stadium 
Before 2008, Persijap plays the home matches in Kamal Djunaedi Stadium. Persijap now plays their home matches in Gelora Bumi Kartini Stadium.

Asian clubs ranking

Supporters 
Persijap Jepara's supporter groups are Jetmania (Jepara Tifosi Mania) and BANASPATI (Barisan Supporter Persijap Sejati).CURVANORDSYNDICATE (ultras persijap )

Players

Current squad

Coaching staff

Honours 
Liga 3
Champions (1): 2019
 Soeratin Cup
 Champions (3): 1982, 1998, 2002
 Megawati Cup
 Champions (1): 2004

See also 
 List of football clubs in Indonesia

References

External links 
 Persijap Jepara at Liga Indonesia
 Persijap official site
 

Football clubs in Indonesia
Football clubs in Central Java
Association football clubs established in 1954
1954 establishments in Indonesia